Turgay Tapu (born April 29, 1982) is a German football player, who played for Rot Weiss Ahlen and SC Roland Beckum.

Tapu was part of the reserve team of RW Ahlen from 2004 until 2008 after which he joined the main team. In 2008, he had three appearances in the 2.Bundesliga after the first goalkeeper of the team, Manuel Lenz, was given a red card causing a two match suspension.

In 2009, Turgay Tapu became part of SC Roland Beckum where he stayed until 2011. In 2011, he went back to his former team RW Ahlen where he played until March 2013. His contract was terminated because of continuing differences with his coach Marco Antwerpen.

External links

1982 births
Living people
German footballers
Rot Weiss Ahlen players
2. Bundesliga players
Association football goalkeepers